Highway 771 is a provincial highway in the Canadian province of Saskatchewan. It runs from Highway 317 near Cactus Lake to Highway 21. Highway 771 is about 49 km (30 mi.) long.

Highway 771 also intersects Highways 31 and 675. Near this intersection is the town of Luseland.

See also 
Roads in Saskatchewan
Transportation in Saskatchewan

References 

771